Interspecific feeding refers to behaviour reported in wild animals, particularly birds where adults of one species feed the young of another species. This usually excludes the case of birds feeding brood parasites. The behaviour has been of theoretical interest since it appears to be provide little evolutionary benefit to the feeding bird. Some researchers have suggested that it is mainly male birds that are lured into feeding a fledgling that begs

Such behaviour is also related to alloparenting, cross-fostering and brood adoption. Several situations have been suggested that lead to this including:
 Bird raised in a mixed clutch 
 Original nest and brood of bird destroyed
 Nests in very close proximity
 Calling of young birds stimulates behaviour
 Orphaned birds adopted temporarily or permanently
 Male bird feeding another species while mate incubated
 Feeding bird is mateless and finds a mateless bird at nest

Shy (1982) listed 65 species of birds involved in interspecific feeding. Riedman (1982) listed 150 species of birds that adopted young that did not belong to themselves.

References

External links
 Nuthatch feeding Bluebird nestlings
 Cardinal feeding goldfish
 Levy, Sharon 2002 Parenting paradox. National Wildlife Magazile 40(5)

Ethology